The Rugby League Charity Shield was a trophy for British rugby league clubs that was held as a one-off match at the beginning of a new season. It was modelled on English football's Charity Shield, and was held between 1985 and 1995. Normally the team that had won last season's championship would play the team that currently held the Challenge Cup. In years where the same team won both trophies the following season's Charity Shield was between them and the Premiership winners. In years where one team won all three competitions then the match would be between them and the second placed team in the championship.

The Charity Shield was held at a variety of venues; the Okells Bowl in Douglas on the Isle of Man was used initially with some regularity.

Results

Footnotes
 Denotes that team were previous season's champions
 Denotes that team were previous season's Premiership winners
 Denotes that team were previous season's championship runners-up

Rugby league competitions in the United Kingdom